The Battle of Chinhai was fought between British and Chinese forces in Chinhai (Zhenhai), Zhejiang province, China, on the 10 October 1841 during the First Opium War. The Chinese force consisted of a garrison of Manchu and Mongol Bannermen. The British capture of this city allowed them to seize Ningpo unopposed on 13 October.

Gallery

References

Bibliography
Hall, William Hutcheon; Bernard, William Dallas (1846). The Nemesis in China (3rd ed.). London: Henry Colburn.
MacPherson, Duncan (1843). Two Years in China (2nd ed.). London: Saunders and Otley

Further reading
The Chinese Repository. Volume 10. Canton. 1841. pp. 680–682.

1841 in China
Chinhai
Chinhai
October 1841 events